St. Mary's High School is a Catholic, archdiocesan, all-boys high school rooted in the Marianist tradition. It has a comprehensive college prep curriculum and offers an honors program along with college credit courses. It is situated on a 27-acre campus in the Dutchtown neighborhood of South St. Louis.

History

In September 1931, South Side Catholic High School opened with Christian Brothers teaching in two classrooms, small buildings on the premises of St. Joseph's Orphanage. Two years later ten Marianist Brothers were teaching 275 students. Beginning in 1935 the orphanage building was remodeled and became the school, from which 62 students graduated in 1936, the year the school received accreditation from the North Central Association of Colleges and Schools and from the University of Missouri. The school reached its peak enrollment of 1,100 students in 1946 and was renamed St. Mary's High in 1947.

When a new, $1.5 million building was completed in 1964, there were 883 students in 19 classrooms, besides three laboratories for science and one for languages, a library, cafeteria, administrative offices, and rooms for 30 Marianists on the third floor. In 1967 a wing was added with rooms for teachers and for guidance, chemistry, biology and typing; and additional classrooms, four of which could be opened to form two rooms seating 110 each. An athletic complex was begun in 1988, with a grass field for football and soccer and an all-weather track. Lighting was added in 1992.

The original gymnasium of 1938 was destroyed by fire in 1993 and replaced with a new complex named for Archbishop John L. May. It included weight rooms, a batting cage, and an alumni meeting room. Computer facilities were added throughout the school in 1993, enhanced in 2004, and again in 2013, when each student was supplied with a notebook computer. In 1998 a chapel was received from Catholic Charities and refurbished to become Holy Family Chapel. In 2000, renovations included converting the Marianist quarters into a fine arts center and band room. The Archdiocese of St. Louis and the United States Province of the Society of Mary continue to sponsor the school, and 19 faculty members have become lay Marianists.

In 2008, property to the west of the school was purchased and a Center for Applied Science was added. It has grown to include electronics and robotics, computer programming, architecture, and graphic design. With the completion of a $5 million fund-raising drive, Divis Field for baseball was added, along with practice fields for soccer. In 2012, the courtyard was improved and memorial bricks added. The football field received artificial turf and improved lighting in 2016.

In 2022, the Archdiocese of St. Louis announced that the school would be closing after the end of the 2022-2023 school year as part of its downsizing plan.

On December 15, 2022, St. Mary's High School announced that a deal with St. Louis Archdiocese will keep the school open. The school has agreed to the terms of a three-year lease with the Archdiocese of St. Louis. The Catholic boys’ high school will stay open next year as the independent St. Mary’s South Side High School in the neighborhood where it first opened in 1931.

Notable alumni

 John Berner, American professional soccer player (Colorado Rapids), (Phoenix Rising FC)
 John Carenza, American professional soccer player with the St. Louis Stars and member of the 1972 U.S. Olympic Team.
 John Collins Muhammad, Alderman of Ward 21 of St. Louis
 Joe Garagiola, MLB player (St. Louis Cardinals, Pittsburgh Pirates, Chicago Cubs, New York Giants) and broadcaster
 Jacob Hummel, Missouri state senator
 LTC Jerry Gasko, USA (Ret)
 Rear Adm. Dan Kloeppel, USN (Ret)
 John McArthur, founder of Johnny Mac's Sporting Goods
 Rudi Roeslein, founder of Roeslein Alternative Energy
 Francis G. Slay, Mayor of St. Louis 2001-2017
 Alex Volansky, CEO of Peerless-Premier Appliance Company

Notable faculty
 John Hamman

References

External links
St. Mary's High School website

Educational institutions established in 1931
Roman Catholic secondary schools in St. Louis
Marianist schools
Boys' schools in Missouri
Roman Catholic Archdiocese of St. Louis
1931 establishments in Missouri